Harry Freeman may refer to:

Harry Freeman (cricketer) (1860–1933), Australian cricketer
Harry Freeman (field hockey) (1876–1968), British field hockey player who won a gold medal at the 1908 Summer Olympics
Harry Lawrence Freeman (1869–1954), United States opera composer, conductor, impresario and teacher
Harry Freeman (footballer) (1918–1997), association footballer who played for Fulham between 1937 and 1952
Harry Freeman (journalist) (1906–1978), American communist journalist
Harry Freeman (music hall performer) (1858–1922), music hall performer

See also
Henry Freeman (disambiguation)
Harold Freeman (disambiguation)
Harry Freedman (disambiguation)